Josué Dorrio Ortega (born 3 March 1994) is a Spanish footballer who plays for CF Talavera de la Reina as a winger.

Club career
Born in Bilbao, Biscay, Basque Country, Dorrio joined Athletic Bilbao's youth setup in 2004 from Santutxu FC. Released in 2008, he subsequently completed his formation with Danok Bat CF before joining Tercera División side Bermeo FT in 2013.

In July 2016 Dorrio moved to SD Eibar, being assigned to the farm team also in the fourth tier. He made his first team debut the following 25 January, starting in a 2–2 Copa del Rey home draw against Atlético Madrid.

On 2 September 2019, after spending two years with the fourth division sides Club Portugalete and Lorca FC, Dorrio joined Real Murcia in Segunda División B.

References

External links

Josué Dorrio profile at Acción Sport 

1994 births
Living people
Spanish footballers
Footballers from Bilbao
Association football wingers
Segunda División B players
Tercera División players
Athletic Bilbao footballers
Danok Bat CF players
CD Vitoria footballers
SD Eibar footballers
Club Portugalete players
Lorca FC players
Real Murcia players
CF Talavera de la Reina players
Bermeo FT footballers
Santutxu FC players